The Kakospictikweak River is a tributary of the North Shore of Gouin Reservoir, sinking in Quebec, Canada in the
administrative region of Mauricie of:
Nord-du-Québec: Eeyou Istchee Baie-James (municipality), townships of Pfister;
Mauricie: territory of the town of La Tuque: townships of Balete and Mathieu.

The forestry is the main economic activity of this valley; recreational tourism activities, second. This road branch connects to route 400 which bypasses the north-eastern
part of the Gouin Reservoir; it connects the village of Parent, Quebec (via the Bazin River) and the village Wemotaci, Quebec which is located west of La Tuque. Some forest roads serve the upper part of this valley.

The surface of the Kakospictikweak River is usually frozen from mid-November to the end of April, however, safe ice circulation is generally from early December to
the end of March.

Geography 
The surrounding hydrographic slopes of the Kakospictikweak River are:
north side: Compton Lake, Nemegousse Lake, Cawcot River, Caopatina Lake;
east side: Dubois Lake, Normandin Lake (Normandin River), Normandin River, Buade Lake (Normandin River);
south side: Gouin reservoir;
west side: Mathieu River, Toussaint River, Baptiste Lake, Larouche Lake, De La Rencontre Creek, Pascagama River.

The Kakospictikweak River originates at the mouth of an unidentified lake (length: ,) located in the township of Pfister, in Eeyou Istchee James Bay (municipality). The mouth of this head lake is located at:
 west of a mountain peak;
 north of the mouth of the Kakospictikweak River (confluence with Omina Lake which is connecter to  Gouin Reservoir);
 north of the village center of Obedjiwan, Quebec (located on a peninsula on the north shore of Gouin Reservoir);
 northwest of the dam at the mouth of the Gouin Reservoir (confluence with the Saint-Maurice River);
 north-east of the village center of Wemotaci, Quebec;
 north-west of downtown La Tuque.

From the mouth of the head lake, the course of the Kakospictikweak River flows over  according to the following segments:

Upper course of the Kakospictikweak River (segment of )

 northeasterly, then southwesterly, skirting a mountain whose summit reaches  and crossing a full length unidentified lake, to its mouth;
 to the South-West including crossing a full length unidentified lake, to its mouth;
 to the southwest, to the eastern limit of Balete. Note: This limit also corresponds to the boundary between the town of La Tuque and Eeyou Istchee Baie-James (municipality);
 southerly passing on the east side of Baptiste Lake and crossing Piresiw Lake, until its confluence which corresponds to the limit of the cantons of Balete and Mathieu. Note: Piresiw Lake receives the Kanimepiriskak Lake outlet on the west side;

Lower course of the Kakospictikweak River (segment of )

 southeasterly by cutting a forest road to the confluence (from the north) of the Pokotciminikew River which drains five mountain lakes upstream;
 southerly collecting the outlet of Kikikwapiskok Lake to the north shore of Kaatcipekinikatek Lake;
 southerly across Kaatcipekinikatek Lake along its entire length to the northern boundary of Mathieu Township. Note: this lake receives on the east side the discharge of the "Froid lake";
 southwesterly, crossing over the  Natowew Lake to the road bridge of route 212 in the Seskatciwan Zone;
 south forming a hook to the east, to the confluence of the Kakospictikweak River with the Gouin Reservoir.

The confluence of the Kakospictikweak River with the Gouin Reservoir is located at:
 northwest of Gouin Dam;
 north-east of the village center of Obedjiwan, Quebec;
 northwest of the village center of Wemotaci, Quebec;
 north-west of downtown La Tuque;
 northwest of the mouth of the Saint-Maurice River (confluence with the St. Lawrence River at Trois-Rivières).

From the mouth of this bay, the current flows south-easterly across the Gouin
reservoir to the southeast, skirting several islands and passing through the Kikendatch Bay, up to the Gouin dam. From there, the current flows along the Saint-Maurice River to Trois-Rivières, where it flows into the St. Lawrence River.

Toponymy 
The toponym "Rivière Kakospictikweak" was formalized on September 6, 1984 at the Commission de toponymie du Québec.

Notes and references

See also 

Tributaries of the Saint-Maurice River
Rivers of Mauricie
La Tuque, Quebec
Rivers of Nord-du-Québec
Eeyou Istchee James Bay